Central Park Towers is a complex of two towers in Dubai International Financial Centre (DIFC) in Dubai, United Arab Emirates.

Site 
Central Park Towers is located in the southwest corner of the Dubai International Financial Centre master community. The areas surrounding Central Park Towers are home to other skyscrapers, including The Index. Financial Centre is the nearest Dubai Metro station.

Notable Tenants 
Tenants of the Office Tower include (as of 2021):

 Bank of Singapore Limited (DIFC Branch)
 Federal Tax Authority
 Huxley Global Associates Limited
 ICICI Bank Limited (DIFC Branch)
 Marriott International

See also 
 List of tallest buildings in Dubai
 List of tallest buildings in the United Arab Emirates

References

External links
 Central Park Towers on Official Website
 Islamic Bank Towers on Emporis.com
 Islamic Bank Office Tower
 Islamic Bank Residential Tower

Residential skyscrapers in Dubai
Twin towers